Steve & Karen's Breakfast Show, is a local radio breakfast show, presented by Steve Furnell and Karen Oxley (née Wight) and currently airing on Metro Radio and TFM in the North East England. The show airs 6-10am, Monday to Friday.

History
The radio breakfast show began on Tuesday 1 June 1999 when Steve Furnell launched regional radio station Galaxy North East. Karen Oxley became his co-presenter in January 2001 after a year as senior broadcast journalist with the station.

Galaxy was rebranded as Capital North East on 3 January 2011 as part of a merger of Global Radio's Galaxy and Hit Music networks to form the nine-station Capital radio network. Furnell and Oxley were retained at the relaunched station.

On 14 July 2011, Metro Radio breakfast presenter Tony Horne left, prior to his contract ending. Furnell and Oxley were announced as his replacements two months later, remaining at Capital until 23 December 2011. The Steve & Karen Breakfast Show aired on Metro for the first time on 6 June 2012 after 5 months of being off-air due to a clause in the contracts issued by their previous employers, Global Radio.

The show resumed airing in Teesside and North Yorkshire on Monday 8 April 2013 when TFM merged with Metro and ceased all local programming apart from news.

Awards and nominations

Arqiva Commercial Radio Awards

Sony Radio Academy Awards

Features

Current features
The show currently uses the following features in its broadcasts:
 Work It Out - Steve and Karen have three 'yes' or 'no' questions to help them and you work out the caller’s job.
 Scrambled Songs - Steve or Karen sing lyrics from one artist over music by another and the caller has to guess the two artists.
 The Wonky Minute - Answering 10 questions correctly in one minute to win £1,000.
 Birthday Bangers - Call in if it’s your birthday for a treat and to choose a song from either Steve or Karen’s selections.
By

Previous features
 Hummer Bummer - Steve or Karen hum a song and a caller must answer correctly.
 Missing Link - Karen gives a caller two things for them to guess the link.
 Morning Glory - Answer a question correctly and win the 'Morning Glory'.
 Tombola of Doom - Two contestants compete in answering some random questions in a certain amount of time. The player with the most points wins an 'I took on the Tombola of Doom and won' t-shirt.
 Baby Jukebox Generator - A song from the year a caller's child was conceived is played.

References

External links
 Steve & Karen's Breakfast Show at Metro Radio
 Steve & Karen's Breakfast Show at TFM

British comedy radio programmes
British radio breakfast shows
Capital (radio network)
Bauer Radio